Charles Waldegrave Sandford (1828–1903) was the fourth Bishop of Gibraltar.

He was born in 1828 into an ecclesiastical family and educated at Rugby and Christ Church, Oxford. Later he was a Tutor there then Rector of Bishopsbourne before his elevation to the episcopate. A Sub-Prelate of the Order of St John of Jerusalem, he died on 8 December 1903. His grandfather Daniel Sandford (bishop of Edinburgh) and first cousin Daniel Sandford (Bishop of Tasmania) was also Anglican bishops.

Publications 
Sandford, C. W. (1886) Our church in Cyprus: a sermon. Oxford & London: Parker and Co.

Notes

1828 births
Alumni of Christ Church, Oxford
People educated at Rugby School
19th-century Anglican bishops of Gibraltar
20th-century Anglican bishops of Gibraltar
1903 deaths
Sub-Prelates of the Venerable Order of Saint John